The following is a list of notable deaths in July 2000.

Entries for each day are listed alphabetically by surname. A typical entry lists information in the following sequence:
 Name, age, country of citizenship at birth, subsequent country of citizenship (if applicable), reason for notability, cause of death (if known), and reference.

July 2000

1
Burt Douglas, 69, American film, stage and television actor.
Victor E. Engstrom, 86, American philatelist.
John Albert Axel Gibson, 83, British World War II air ace.
Begum Om Habibeh Aga Khan, 94, fourth and last wife of Sir Sultan Muhammad Shah.
Ganju Lama, 75, Sikkimese Gurkha and recipient of the Victoria Cross.
Walter Matthau, 79, American actor (winner of Academy Award for Best Supporting Actor, BAFTA, Golden Globe and Tony awards).

2
Joey Dunlop, 48, Northern Irish motorcycle racer, motorcycle accident.
Constance Howard, 89, English textile artist and embroiderer.
Paul McLaughlin, 80, Canadian sailor and Olympian.
Karl Sweetan, 57, American gridiron footballplayer, complications following surgery.

3
Walter Cassel, 90, American operatic baritone and actor.
Nancy Cato, 83, Australian writer and poet.
James Grogan, 68, American figure skater and Olympian, multiple organ failure.
André Guinier, 88, French physicist.
Sir Michael Hamilton, 81, British politician.
Paul G. Hatfield, 72, American attorney and politician.
John Hejduk, 70, Czech-American architect, artist and educator.
Enric Miralles, 45, Spanish architect, brain tumor.
Harold Nicholas, 79, American dancer (Nicholas Brothers), heart attack.
Kemal Sunal, 55, Turkish actor, heart attack.

4
Ángel Aranda, 65, Spanish actor.
Jack T. Bradley, 82, US Army Air Force fighter ace.
Gustaw Herling-Grudziński, 81, Polish writer and political dissident.
Yuri Klinskikh, 35, Russian singer, songwriter and arranger.
Philip Lever, 3rd Viscount Leverhulme, 85, British aristocrat.

5
Franta Belsky, 79, Czech sculptor, prostate cancer.
Mehrangiz Manouchehrian, 94, Iranian lawyer, musician and feminist.
Blanca Álvarez Mantilla, 68, Spanish journalist.
Peter "Bullfrog" Moore, 68, Australian rugby league administrator.
Dorino Serafini, 90, Italian motorcycle road racer and racing driver.
Lord Woodbine, 71, Trinidadian calypsonian and music promoter, house fire.

6
Miervaldis Birze, 79, Latvian writer, publicist and physician.
Roderic Coote, 85, British Anglican prelate.
Eric Fraser, 69, English rugby player.
Lazar Koliševski, 86, Yugoslav communist political leader.
Fred Lane, 24, American football player.
Władysław Szpilman, 88, Jewish-Polish pianist portrayed in the 2002 film The Pianist.
Marcella Comès Winslow, 95, American photographer and portrait painter.

7
Dame Stella Casey, 76, New Zealand social activist.
Kenny Irwin Jr., 30, American stock car racing driver, racing accident.
Jip de Jager, 87, South African politician.
Ursula Kuczynski, 93, German communist activist and spy.
James C. Quayle, 79, American newspaper publisher.
William J. Randall, 90, American politician.
George T. Rockrise, 83, American architect and urban planner.
Charles Alan Wright, 72, American constitutional lawyer.

8
FM-2030, 69, Iranian-American author, teacher, transhumanist philosopher and futurist, pancreatic cancer.
Dame Anne Mueller, 69, British civil servant and academic.
Maurice Owen, 76, English footballer.
Cliff Sear, 63, Welsh footballer, heart attack.

9
Doug Fisher, 59,  English actor, heart attack.
John Morgan, 41, British etiquette expert.
John Vitale, 34, American football player, cancer.

10
Leo Egan, 86, American broadcaster.
Vakkom Majeed, 90, Indian politician.
Ursule Molinaro, French-born American writer.
Denis O'Conor Don, O'Conor Don, hereditary Chief of the Name O'Conor.
Justin Pierce, 25, British skateboarder and actor (Kids, Next Friday), suicide.

11
Bill Alexander, 90, British political activist.
Jaroslav Filip, 51, Slovak musician, composer, dramaturge and actor, heart attack.
Pedro Mir, 87, Dominican poet and writer (Poet Laureate).
Robert Runcie, 78, British Archbishop of Canterbury, cancer.
Barry Tabobondung, 39, Canadian ice hockey player, vehicular accident.

12
Tom Galley, 84, English footballer.
Charles Merritt, 91, Canadian war hero and recipient of the Victoria Cross.
Prince Tomislav of Yugoslavia, 72, Yugoslav prince.

13
James Ferguson, 86, U.S. Air Force general.
Dick Edgar Ibarra Grasso, 86, Argentine historian and researcher.
A. D. Hope, 92, Australian poet.
Masha Ivashintsova, 58, Russian photographer.
Jan Karski, 86, Polish resistance fighter and academic.

14
Bill Barth, 57, American blues guitarist, heart attack.
Alvin Hollingsworth, 72, American painter and comics artist.
Eric Edward Khasakhala, 74, Kenyan politician and independence activist.
Robert B. Landry, 90, United States Air Force major general.
Meredith MacRae, 56, American actress (My Three Sons, Petticoat Junction), complications of brain cancer.
Georges Maranda, 68, Canadian baseball player.
Sir Mark Oliphant, 98, Australian physicist, Governor of South Australia.

15
Paul Bühlmann, 73, Swiss comedian, radio personality, and  actor.
Johnny Duncan, 67, American bluegrass musician.
Jocko Henderson, 82, American radio disc jockey, and hip hop music pioneer, cancer.
Leo Hoegh, 92, U.S. Army officer, lawyer, and politician.
Owen Maynard, 75, Canadian engineer and co-designer of NASA's Apollo Lunar Module (LM).
John Pastore, 93, American lawyer and politician.
Louis Quilico, 75, Canadian opera singer.
Kalle Svensson, 74, Swedish footballer.
Paul Young, 53, British singer and songwriter (Sad Café, Mike + The Mechanics).

16
Igor Domnikov, 41, Russian journalist and editor, murdered.
György Petri, 56, Hungarian poet, cancer.
Jean Vercoutter, 89, French Egyptologist.
Bernie Whitebear, 62, American Indian activist, colon cancer.
William Foote Whyte, 86, American sociologist.

17
Zhao Lirong, 72, Chinese singer and film actress, cancer.
Aligi Sassu, 88, Italian painter and sculptor.
Thomas Quinn Curtiss, 85, American writer, and film and theater critic.
Warren P. Waters, 77, American physicist, inventor and WWII US Air Force pilot, kidney failure.

18
Roberto Contreras, 71, American actor.
Paul Coverdell, 61, US Senator from Georgia, cerebral hemorrhage.
Archie Craig, 88, Scottish racing cyclist.
John F. Davis, 93, American lawyer and law professor.
Ray Gabelich, 67, Australian rules footballer.

19
James B. Clark, 92, American film and television director.
Stephen Gendin, 34, American AIDS activist, AIDS-induced lymphoma.
Hananiah Harari, 87, American painter and illustrator.
Owen Maddock, 74, British engineer and racing car designer.
Tommy O'Boyle, 82, American football coach.
Allen Paulson, 78, American businessman.

20
Eladio Dieste, 82, Uruguayan engineer and architect.
Eyvind Earle, 84, American artist, author and illustrator, esophageal cancer.
Joseph F. Enright, 89, submarine captain in the US Navy.
James H. Morrison, 91, American politician (member of the United States House of Representatives from Louisiana's 6th congressional district).
Kao Pao-shu, 68, Chinese actress, producer, writer and film director.
Murray G. Ross, 90, Canadian sociologist, author, and academic administrator.
Jim Suchecki, 72, American baseball player.
Alexis P. Vlasto, 84, British historian and philologist.

21
Vladimir Bagirov, 63, Soviet-Latvian grandmaster of chess, chess author, and trainer, heart attack.
Constanze Engelbrecht, 50, German actress, cancer.
Iain Hamilton, 78, Scottish composer.
Maria Kleschar-Samokhvalova, 84, Soviet Russian painter and graphic artist.
Yosef Qafih, 82, Yemenite-Israeli zionist orthodox rabbi.

22
John Butterfield, Baron Butterfield, 80, British medical researcher and academic administrator.
Alexander Dallin, 76, American historian and political scientist.
Raymond Lemieux, 80, Canadian organic chemist.
Claude Sautet, 76, French film director and screenwriter.
Staffan Burenstam Linder, 68, Swedish economist and politician.
Pat Turner, 73, British trade unionist.

23
Vittorio Mangano, 59, member of the Sicilian Mafia, cancer.
Carmen Martín Gaite, 74, Spanish author.
Mars Rafikov, 66, Soviet cosmonaut.
Ahmad Shamlou, 74, Iranian poet, writer and journalist.
Sandor Teszler, 97, Hungarian-American businessman and philanthropist.

24
Anatoli Firsov, 59, Russian ice hockey player.
Dharmasiri Senanayake, 67, Sri Lankan politician.
Alvin Tresselt, 83, American children's book author and graphic designer.
G. Wood, 80, American film and television actor, congestive heart failure.

25
Julia Pirotte, 92, Polish photojournalist.
Fred C. Sheffey, 71, United States Army major general, lung cancer.
Elizabeth Wilson, 86, American screenwriter and playwright.

 Notable people killed in the crash of Air France Flight 4590:
Rudi Faßnacht, 65, German football manager.
Christian Götz, 60, German trade unionist and politician.
Jean Marcot, 50, French first officer of Flight 4590.
Christian Marty, 54, French windsurfer and captain of Flight 4590.
Andreas Schranner, 64, German property magnate.

26
Abhayadev, 87, Indian poet and lyricist.
Albert Fear, 92, Welsh rugby player.
U. R. Jeevarathinam, Tamil actress, singer and producer.
Dalkhan Khozhaev, 39, Chechen historian, field commander, brigadier general and author, murdered.
John Tukey, 85, American mathematician.
Don Weis, 78, American film and television director.

27
Virginia Admiral, 85, American painter and poet.
Albert van Dantzig, 63, Dutch historian, Alzheimer's disease.
Bruce Douglas-Mann, 73, British politician.
Val Dufour, 73, American actor.
Paddy Joyce, 77, Irish actor, stroke.
Vladimir Lisunov, 60, Russian nonconformist artist, murdered.
Gordon Solie, 71, American wrestling commentator,  throat cancer.
Constance Stuart Larrabee, 85, English photographer and war correspondent.

28
Jaime Cardriche, 32, American actor, complications during gall bladder surgery.
Margaret Chapman, 59, English illustrator and painter.
Rokeya Rahman Kabeer, 74, Bangladeshi academic and feminist.
Abraham Pais, 82, Dutch-born American physicist.
Jonas M. Platt, 80, United States Marine Corps officer.
Jerome Smith, 47, American guitarist (KC and the Sunshine Band).
Chic Stone, 77, American comic book artist.
John Wells, 93, British artist.

29
Roger Batzel, 78, American nuclear scientist.
Kobie Coetsee, 69, South African lawyer and politician, heart attack.
René Favaloro, 77, Argentine cardiologist who invented the technique of coronary bypass surgery, suicide by gunshot.
Benny Fenton, 81, English football player and manager.
Nestor Pirotte, 67, Belgian serial killer, heart attack.
Bob Welch, 72, Canadian politician.

30
Derek Hill, 83, English portrait and landscape painter.
Max Showalter, (aka Casey Adams), 83, American actor, composer, pianist, singer, cancer.
Jack Smiley, 77, American basketball player.

31
Constance Babington Smith, 87, British journalist and writer.
István Gulyás, 68, Hungarian tennis player.
Hendrik C. van de Hulst, 81, Dutch astronomer and mathematician.
William Keepers Maxwell Jr., 91, American novelist, short story writer, essayist and children's author.

References 

2000-07
 07